Anastasia Protasenya (born 22 December 1993, in Moscow), patronymic Alexandrovna, Russian Анастасия Александровна Протасеня, is a Russian professional triathlete, member of the National Russian Team, National Youth Champion of the year 2010 and number 4 in the Junior category.

In 2009 Anastasia Protasenya competed for the first time in ITU triathlons and won a bronze medal at the European Cup in Tarzo Revine.
In 2010, she took part in the Junior Team Relay European Championships and in a Junior European Cup, placing second and first respectively. Thanks to the gold medal she entered the Junior European Rankings / Women Standing at number 31 of 95.

One day after the European Cup triathlon Protasenya took part in the International Alanya Swimming Marathon and won the (elite) bronze medal.

Like Inna Tsyganok and Lyubov Ivanovskaya, Anastasia Protasenya attends an elite sports school for prospective Olympians in Moscow (Московское Среднее Специальное Училище Олимпийского Резерва No. 2) and belongs to the most promising Russian juniors. At the Grand Final of the Russian Cup 2010 in Voronezh she placed first in the Russian Youth category (5 September 2010), in Nizhny Novgorod she had already won the junior silver medal (20 June 2010).

ITU Competitions 

In the four years from 2009 to 2012, Protasenya took part in 15 ITU competitions and achieved eight top ten placements.
The following list is based upon the official ITU rankings and the athlete's ITU Profile Page.

DNF = did not finish · DNS = did not start

External links
 Russian Triathlon Federation

Notes

Russian female triathletes
Living people
1993 births
Sportspeople from Moscow